Love Destiny is a 2018 Thai historical television series that originally aired on Channel 3 from February 21 to April 11, 2018. The 15-episode series contains elements of romance, comedy, and time travel. Starring Ranee Campen and Thanawat Wattanaputi, Love Destiny was a major hit in Thailand and gained popularity across Asia and contributed to a rise of tourists in the filming locations. Its success has been attributed to its elaborate screenplay, costumes, and locations.

The lakorn, set in Ayutthaya Kingdom, during the reign of King Narai, is an adaptation of the novel of the same name by Rompaeng, the penname of Chanyawi Somprida. The novel got the Seven book award in 2010 and was adapted into a television drama for the first time in this series. The television adaptation was done by Broadcast Thai Television, the scriptwrier was Sanlaya, and the director was Pawat Panangsiri.

Synopsis

While traveling back home from a school excavation trip in Ayutthaya, Ketsurang (Ranee Campen), a history student and her friend, Rueang (Prama Imanothai), got into a car accident. Ketsurang woke up in the body of Karaket (การะเกด), the daughter of the ruler of Phitsanulok who was living in Ayutthaya, the capital of the Ayutthaya Kingdom, during the reign of King Narai (1656–1688). She lived in the residence of King Narai's chief astrologer, Phraya Horathibodi (พระยาโหราธิบดี), who is the father of her fiancé, Det (Thanawat Wattanaputi), a foreign ministry official holding the noble title of Muen Sunthon Thewa. The eccentric and goofy behavior of a modern-day woman like Ketsurang shocks everyone, but her kindness changes their attitudes towards her, eventually winning their hearts and minds. She amazes the people with her knowledge of the historical events of the era and questions the veracity of the knowledge she had learned in the future.

The drama also includes the Ayutthayan embassy accredited to the court of King Louis XIV of France, with Pan as the ambassador. And the successful enterprise of Phra Phet Racha, King Narai's xenophobic regent, to seize power and get rid of the Christians in the kingdom. The coup is supported by the Buddhist clergy and Narai's own daughter, Princess Sudawadi, and leads to the execution of Phaulkon, who holds the position of Prime Counsellor of Ayutthaya and assumes the Thai noble title of Chao Phraya Wichayen.

Cast

Main
 Ranee Campen as Ketsurang / Karaket
 Thanawat Wattanaputi as Det, son of Chaophraya Horathibodi and Champa
 Louis Scott as Constantine Phaulkon
 Susira Nanna as Maria Guyomar de Pinha, Phaulkon's wife
 Parama Imanothai as Rueang / Rueangrit
 Kannarun Wongkajornklai as Lady Chanwat, daughter of Lek and Nim

Supporting
 Praptpadol Suwanbang as King Narai
 Sarut Vijittranon as Phra Phet Racha, Narai's regent
 Jirayu Thantrakul as Luang Sorasak, Phra Phet Racha's son
 Nirut Sirijanya as Chaophraya Horathibodi, Narai's chief astrologer
 Chamaiporn Jaturaput as Lady Champa, Chaophraya Horathibodi's wife
 Surasak Chaiat as Kosa Lek, Narai's foreign minister
 Chartchai Ngamsan as Kosa Pan, Lek's younger brother
 Rachanee Siralert as Lady Nim, Lek's wife
 Ampha Phoosit as Prik, Champa's attendant
 Vimon Panchalijunha as Chuan, Champa's attendant
 Janya Thanasawaangkoun as Phin, Karaket's attendant
 Ramida Prapatsanobon as Yaem, Karaket's attendant
 Witsarut Himmarat as Choi, Det's attendant

Special appearances
 Paweena Chariffsakul as Ketsurang's mother
 Banjerdsri Yamabhaya as Ketsurang's grandmother
 Tachaya Prathumwan as Phra Pi, Narai's adopted son
 Natanop Chuenhirun as Si Prat, Det's older brother
 Thongkao Pattarachokechai as Maria's father
 Suzana Renaud as Clara, Maria's attendant
 Wariya Thaisaet as Claudia, Maria's attendant
 Watcharachai Sunthornsiri as Achan Chi Pa Khao (White-Robed Master)
 Wiksawaweet Wongwannlop as Luang Si Yot, Narai's minister
 Peter Tuinstra as Simon de la Loubère

Original soundtrack
 "Bupphesanniwat" (บุพเพสันนิวาส), opening theme by Saranyu Winaipanit
 "Phiang Sop Ta" (เพียงสบตา; "Just Eye Contact"), ending theme by Sarunrat Dean
 "Ochao Oei" (ออเจ้าเอย; "Thou Oh Thou") by Pete Pol
 Special version by Thanavat Vatthanaputi
 "Thoe No Thoe" (เธอหนอเธอ; "You Oh You") by Wathiya Ruangnirat
 Special version by Ranee Campen

Ratings
In this table,  represent the lowest ratings and  represent the highest ratings.

Specials

Sequels
Love Destiny: The Movie – spin-off movie (2022)
Love Destiny 2 – sequel series (2022)

References

External links
  

Thai historical television series
2018 Thai television series debuts
2018 Thai television series endings
Thai television soap operas
2010s Thai television series
Channel 3 (Thailand) original programming
Thai time travel television series
History of Thailand in fiction
Television series by Broadcast Thai Television